Chondrocephalus granulifrons is a beetle of the family Passalidae originally described by George Latimer Bates in 1886 under the name Popilius granulifrons.

References 

Passalidae
Beetles described in 1886